Cameron Smith may refer to:

 Cameron Smith (rugby league, born 1983), Australian rugby league footballer
 Cameron Smith (rugby league, born 1998), English rugby league footballer
 Cameron Smith (golfer) (born 1993), Australian golfer
 Cammy Smith (Cameron Smith, born 1995), Scottish association footballer
 Cammie Smith (Cameron Wilberforce Smith, born 1933), West Indian cricketer
 Cameron Smith (American football) (born 1997), American football linebacker
 Cameron Smith (curler) (born 1993), Scottish curler

See also 
 Cam Smith, British comic book artist
 Cameron Smyth (born 1971), United States politician
 Hotel Books, a spoken-word project for the poet Cam Smith